The Naval Flight Officer insignia is a breast insignia of the United States military which is awarded to those aviators of the Navy, Marine Corps and Coast Guard who have qualified as Naval Flight Officers (NFO) based on successful completion of flight training.  The insignia is similar in design to the Naval Aviator insignia, consisting of a pair of golden wings, a shield, and crossed anchors.

The Naval Flight Officer insignia is identical for both branches and is awarded in a single degree.  To qualify for the NFO insignia, a service member must have completed officer aviation training and be qualified as a systems operator on board a Naval aircraft.  Such qualifications include weapons system operations, airborne tactical data system operations, electronic warfare, and airborne navigation.

The insignia originated in the 1930s and evolved from the Naval Aviation Observer insignia.  The main reason for creating the NFO insignia in 1965-1966 was to recognize the higher degree of training required for naval flight officers, compared to other airborne support personnel.

In the modern space age, the insignia is also upgradeable to a variation of the Naval Aviator Astronaut insignia.  Known as the Naval Flight Officer Astronaut insignia, the decoration is a standard NFO insignia upon which is centered a golden astronaut "shooting star" logo.  The badge is issued for those Naval Flight Officers who have completed astronaut training at NASA and have subsequently participated in a space flight more than 50 miles above the Earth.

Previously, the United States Coast Guard equivalent of the Naval Flight Officer insignia was known as the Coast Guard Flight Officer Badge. It was similar in appearance to the NFO wings (minus the crossed anchors) and was declared obsolete in 1991.

See also
List of United States Navy enlisted warfare designations
Badges of the United States Navy
Military badges of the United States
Obsolete badges of the United States military
Uniforms of the United States Navy

United States military badges